Tulian Lake is an alpine lake located near Pahalgam in Anantnag district of Jammu and Kashmir, India. The lake often has chunks of ice floating in it. It is located in a meadow dotted with pine forests. The lake lies in the great Himalayan range.

References 

Lakes of Jammu and Kashmir
Tourist attractions in Anantnag district